Margherita is an Italian feminine given name. It also is a surname.  As a word, in Italian it means "daisy".

Given name
As a name, it may refer to:

Margherita Aldobrandini (1588–1646), Duchess consort of Parma
Margherita de' Medici (1612–1679), Duchess of Parma and Piacenza
Margherita Maria Farnese (1664–1718), Duchess of Modena and Reggio
Princess Margherita of Bourbon-Parma (1847–1893)
Margherita of Savoy (1851–1926), former Queen Consort of Italy and wife of Umberto I
Margherita, Archduchess of Austria-Este (born 1930)
Margherita Bagni (1902–1960), Italian actress
Margherita Piazzola Beloch (1879–1976), Italian mathematician
Margherita Boniver (born 1938), Italian politician
Margherita Buy (born 1962), Italian actress
Margherita Caffi (1650–1710), Italian painter of still lifes
Margherita Carosio (1908–2005), Italian operatic soprano
Margherita Durastanti (fl. 1700–1734), Italian singer 
Margherita Galeotti (1867–after 1912), Italian pianist and composer
Margherita Gargano (born 1952), Italian middle-distance runner
Margherita Gonzaga (disambiguation)
Margherita Granbassi (born 1979), Italian fencer
Margherita Grandi (1894–1972), Australian-born Italian soprano born Margaret Gard
Margherita Guidacci (1921–1992), Italian poet 
Margherita Hack (1922–2013), Italian astrophysicist and popular science writer
Margherita Magnani (born 1987), Italian middle-distance runner
Margherita Roberti, American operatic soprano whose career began in 1948 and ended in 1988
Margherita Sarfatti (1880–1961), Italian journalist and mistress of Benito Mussolini
Margherita Taylor (born 1972), English TV and radio presenter
Margherita Zalaffi (born 1966), Italian fencer

Surname
 Lesli Margherita, American actress

See also 
Regina Margherita (disambiguation)
Santa Margherita (disambiguation)
Pizza Margherita
"Felicidad (Margherita)", a song
Margaret (name)
Margaret (disambiguation)
Margarita (disambiguation)

Feminine given names
Given names derived from gemstones
Italian feminine given names